Yaguarú is a small town in Bolivia. The town's name means "wolf", in Guarani.

References

Populated places in Santa Cruz Department (Bolivia)